Bar Aftab-e Golin (also Romanized as Bar Aftāb-e Golīn) is a village in Qaleh Shahin Rural District, in the Central District of Sarpol-e Zahab County, Kermanshah Province, Iran. At the 2006 census, its population was 89, in 18 families.

References 

Populated places in Sarpol-e Zahab County